Kalibari Mandir is a Hindu temple in Peshawar, in the Khyber Pakhtunkhwa province of Pakistan. This temple is dedicated to the Hindu goddess Kali and Durga Puja is its main festival.

History
It is one of the few surviving Hindu temple in Peshawar, along with Goraknath Mandir, Gor Khatri and Dargah Pir Ratan Nath Jee, Jhanda Bazaar. This is the only ongoing functional temple in daily use along with Dargah Pir Ratan Nath Jee, Jhanda Bazaar. Court ordered the Evacuee Trust Property Board to open the Goraknath Mandir, Gor Khatri, which opens once a year on Diwali.

See also

 Hinduism in Pakistan
 Evacuee Trust Property Board
 Hinglaj Mata
 Katasraj temple
 Krishna Mandir, Lahore
 Multan Sun Temple
 Prahladpuri Temple, Multan
 Sadh Belo
 Shivaharkaray
 Shiv Mandir, Umerkot
 Shri Varun Dev Mandir
 Tilla Jogian

References

Hinduism in Pakistan
Hinduism in Khyber Pakhtunkhwa
Hindu temples in Peshawar
Hindu temples in Khyber Pakhtunkhwa
Hindu temples in Pakistan
Hindu pilgrimage sites in Pakistan

External links
 
 Evacuee Trust Property Board (ETPB) website